Bucerdea Grânoasă is a commune located in Alba County, Transylvania, Romania. It has a population of 2,234. It is composed of four villages: Bucerdea Grânoasă, Cornu (Kornujalja), Pădure (Székelyhegytanya) and Pânca. These were part of Crăciunelu de Jos Commune until 2006, when they were split off.

The Bucerdea Grânoasă train station serves Line 300 of the CFR network, which runs from Bucharest to Blaj to Teiuș and then towards the Hungarian border. A rail crash occurred here in the morning of October 7, 1968: due to a signalman's error, a fast passenger train collided head-on with a local train; 22 people were killed, and 72 seriously injured. This was Romania's second railway accident in number of victims after the Ciurea rail disaster of 1917.

References

Communes in Alba County
Localities in Transylvania